This is a list of past and present members of the Senate of Canada representing the province of Saskatchewan.

Current senators

Notes:

1 Senators are appointed to represent Saskatchewan. Each senator may choose to designate a geographic area within Saskatchewan as his or her division.
2 Senators are appointed by the Governor-General of Canada on the recommendation of the prime minister.

Historical senators

Notes:

1 Senators are appointed to represent Saskatchewan. Each senator may choose to designate a geographic area within Saskatchewan as his or her division.
2 Senators are appointed by the Governor-General of Canada on the recommendation of the prime minister.
3 Two senators were appointed under a rarely used regional expansion clause by Brian Mulroney that increased the Senate seats from 104 to 112 on September 27, 1990. For the Western provinces, one designated a division in Saskatchewan and the other in Manitoba. The expansion includes two seats each for the Western provinces, Ontario, Quebec and the Maritimes.
4 These three senators held their respective territorial designations from there appointment until August 31, 1905, as senators from the Northwest Territories. From September 1, they held those designations as senators from the newly established Saskatchewan.

See also
Lists of Canadian senators

Saskatchewan
Senators